Buno is an ethnic minority people of Bangladesh mostly found in Rajshahi, Rangpur, Khulna and Dhaka division. They are nomadic tribal people like Romani and Bede people. They do not live in a single place permanently. They often move one village to another village. They keep pigs, sheep and goats with them. They move into the grasslands for their animals. 

They are animist. They believe in animistic faith. Recently, some of them have converted to Hinduism and Christianity. They have their own distinct language related to Munda, Dravid, Oraon Sadri and Romani or Domari languages. But they can speak Bengali fluently. 

The exact figure of the population of Buno people is unavailable. Perhaps, 100000 to 200000 Buno exist throughout Bangladesh. This ethnic group is less studied and less known to scholars. Sometimes, Buno people can be considered as Oraon, Santal or Dom people. But Buno is much similar to Bagdi people.

Ethnic groups in Bangladesh